Anderson Vieira Martins (born 21 August 1987) is a Brazilian professional footballer who plays as a centre-back for CSA.

Club career
Born in Fortaleza, capital of Ceará state, Anderson Martins started his career with Bahia club Vitória. In December 2003 he signed a three-year contract and extended in March 2006 and in August 2007. He made his Brazilian Série B debut on 7 August 2007, at that time already known as Anderson Martins to disambiguate with teammates Anderson Ferreira and Anderson Rodrigues. The team promoted to 2008 Campeonato Brasileiro Série A as the fourth place. He played 3 more seasons for Vitória, winning 2008 to 2010 Campeonato Baiano and 2010 Campeonato do Nordeste.

In December 2010 he was signed by Traffic Group as an investment (through subsidiary Desportivo Brasil) and loaned to Vasco da Gama in four-year deal.

In August Traffic Group (which owned the entire contract of Anderson) mutually agreed with him on a 4-year contract with El Jaish of Qatar, despite receiving offers from Portugal, Germany and France. He was persuaded by teammate Juninho who had a stint in Qatar, convincing him that football in Qatar is advanced and that it is a gateway to European clubs. He has stated his desire to join a European club after his contract with Al-Jaish is over.

His arrival to El Jaish was delayed until mid-season. He made his debut on 2 January 2012, scoring a free-kick goal.

On January, 12th, 2018, Martins was appointed for São Paulo. In his interview, defender said he came to Tricolor Paulista because they are "a winner club, I came in a search of titles." He will wear shirt number 4. Twelve days later, Martins made his debut with club, in a victory by 2–0 against Mirassol Futebol Clube, a match valid for São Paulo State League.

International career
He capped 3 times in 2005 Sendai Cup. Brazil was the champion.

Career statistics

Honours
Vitória
Campeonato Baiano: 2007, 2008, 2009, 2010
Copa do Nordeste: 2010

Vasco da Gama
Copa do Brasil: 2011

References

External links
 
 Profile at Traffic
 Futpedia 

Brazilian footballers
Esporte Clube Vitória players
Desportivo Brasil players
CR Vasco da Gama players
Sport Club Corinthians Paulista players
São Paulo FC players
El Jaish SC players
Al-Gharafa SC players
Umm Salal SC players
Association football central defenders
Sportspeople from Fortaleza
1987 births
Living people
Brazilian expatriate sportspeople in Qatar
Expatriate footballers in Qatar
Campeonato Brasileiro Série A players
Campeonato Brasileiro Série B players
Qatar Stars League players
Esporte Clube Bahia players
Centro Sportivo Alagoano players